Nam Mae Phong is a watercourse of Thailand with its source in the Phi Pan Nam Range. It is a tributary of the Yom River, part of the Chao Phraya River basin.

Phong